Marcos Caldeira (born 27 February 1988) is a Portuguese athlete competing in the long and triple jump. He won bronze medal in the long jump at the 2007 European Junior Championships.

Competition record

Personal bests
Outdoor
Long jump – 7.58 m (+2.0) (Hengelo 2007)
Triple jump – 16.44 m (+1.8) (Lisbon 2012)
Indoor
Long jump – 7.81 m (Espinho 2010)

References

External links

1988 births
Living people
People from Oeiras, Portugal
Portuguese male long jumpers
Portuguese male triple jumpers
S.L. Benfica athletes
Competitors at the 2011 Summer Universiade
Competitors at the 2013 Summer Universiade
Sportspeople from Lisbon District